The Classic Concert Live is a live album by Mel Tormé, Gerry Mulligan, and George Shearing, recorded at Carnegie Hall in 1982 and released in 2005. 

Shearing and Tormé would go on to make six albums together for Concord Records, this is the only recorded performance of Shearing and Tormé with Gerry Mulligan.

Reception

The Allmusic review by Matt Collar said that the trio of Tormé, Mulligan and Shearing sounded "terrific", with Shearing "in fine form with his urbane keyboard style adding dramatic punch throughout the night".

Track listing
 "I've Heard That Song Before" (Sammy Cahn, Jule Styne) – 2:53
 "I Sent for You Yesterday and Here You Come Today" (Count Basie, Eddie Durham, Jimmy Rushing) – 4:55
 "Jeru" (Gerry Mulligan) – 4:05
 Duke Ellington medley: "Don't Get Around Much Anymore"/"Just Squeeze Me (But Please Don't Tease Me)" (Duke Ellington, Bob Russell)/(Ellington, Lee Gaines) – 5:24
 "What Are You Doing the Rest of Your Life?" (Alan and Marilyn Bergman, Michel Legrand) – 6:20
 "Walkin' Shoes" (Mulligan) – 3:58
 "'Round Midnight" (Cootie Williams, Bernie Hanighen, Thelonious Monk) – 5:56
 "Line for Lyons" (Mulligan) – 5:22
 Talk – 0:52
 "Wave"/"Water to Drink (Agua de Beber)" (Antonio Carlos Jobim)/(Jobim, Vinícius de Moraes, Norman Gimbel) – 6:03
 "Blues in the Night" (Harold Arlen, Johnny Mercer) – 11:28
 "The Song is Ended (but the Melody Lingers On)" (Irving Berlin) – 3:05
 "Oh, Lady Be Good!" (George Gershwin, Ira Gershwin) – 4:47

Personnel 
Performance

 Mel Tormé - vocals
 George Shearing - piano, vocals
 Gerry Mulligan - baritone saxophone, vocals
 Richard DeRosa - drums
 Don Thompson - double bass, piano
 Frank Luther - double bass
 Mitchel Forman - piano
 Tom Boras - saxophone
 Gary Keller
 Mike Milgore
 Chuck Wilson
 Richard Chamberlain - trombone
 Jim Daniels
 Dave Glenn
 Michael Carubia - trumpet
 Laurie Frink
 Gary Guzio
 Chris Rogers

Production

 Abbey Anna - art direction
 Dale Sheets - associate producer
 Barry Hatcher - author
 Tim Owens - engineer
 John Burk - executive producer
 Ken Dryden - liner notes
 Seth Presant - mastering, mixing
 Andrew Pham - package design
 Franca Rota Mulligan - photography
 Marc Perlman
 Christian Steiner
 Chris Dunn - producer

References

Mel Tormé live albums
George Shearing live albums
Gerry Mulligan live albums
Albums recorded at Carnegie Hall
1982 live albums
Concord Records live albums